Hugh Green (January 2, 1887 – November 30, 1968) was an American politician and lawyer.

Born on a farm near Nashville, Illinois, Green received his bachelor's degree from Illinois College and his law degree from Northwestern University School of Law. He practiced law in Jacksonville, Illinois. From 1925 to 1932, Green was state's attorney for Morgan County, Illinois and was a Republican. He served in the Illinois House of Representatives from 1933 until 1961 and was speaker of the house in 1945 and 1947. After Green left the house, he returned to his law practice in Jacksonville, Illinois.

Notes

1887 births
1968 deaths
Politicians from Jacksonville, Illinois
People from Nashville, Illinois
Illinois College alumni
Northwestern University Pritzker School of Law alumni
Illinois lawyers
Republican Party members of the Illinois House of Representatives
Speakers of the Illinois House of Representatives
20th-century American politicians
20th-century American lawyers